Roy Henry Vickers,  (born June 1946 in Laxgalts'ap (now known as Greenville), British Columbia) is a Grammy Award nominated Canadian First Nations artist.  He owns and operates a gallery in Tofino, British Columbia.

Biography
Vickers was born on the Nass River but raised in Kitkatla, Hazelton, British Columbia, and Victoria, B.C.  His father was a fisherman who was matrilineally Tsimshian, also with Haida and Heiltsuk ancestry.  His mother was a schoolteacher whose parents had emigrated from England and who was in the 1940s adopted into the Eagle clan at Kitkatla, B.C. (making Roy also Eagle).  His grandfather was a Kitkatla canoe-carver.  The paintings and works that he has created reflect this mixed heritage as his work has many elements of the traditional art of the First Nations peoples of the Pacific Northwest, but remains quite distinctive.

Vickers became interested in Northwest Coast art partly under the influence of the anthropologist Wilson Duff.

His work has been the official gift of the Province of British Columbia to visiting foreign leaders several times.  In 1987 the original of his painting A Meeting of Chiefs was the official gift to Queen Elizabeth II and in 1993 artist's proofs of his print The Homecoming were the Province's gift to Bill Clinton and Boris Yeltsin.

Vickers has been the artistic advisor to several events in British Columbia.  In 1994 he was the artistic advisor to the architects and designers of the 1994 Commonwealth Games.  For the Games Vickers also created more than 20 totem poles.  Also, from 1987 to 1995, Vickers was the artistic advisor for the Vancouver International Airport's new terminal. Some of his work is prominently displayed there for travellers to admire.

Once a substance abuser, in 1992 he created VisionQuest, a non-profit organization designed to help individuals with addictive personalities.

Publications
Vickers has published several books which are collections of his art, and has illustrated many other works. Among these publications are:

 
 
 
 
 

He has also collaborated with Lucky Budd on several children's picture books.

Awards
In 1998 Vickers received the Order of British Columbia. In 2006, he was made a Member of the Order of Canada.

Bibliography

 Jensen, Doreen, and Polly Sargent (1986) Robes of Power: Totem Poles on Cloth.  Vancouver: University of British Columbia Press.

References

External links
 Roy Henry Vickers' website.

1946 births
Living people
20th-century First Nations sculptors
Canadian male sculptors
20th-century Canadian male artists
21st-century First Nations people
Canadian contemporary painters
First Nations printmakers
First Nations painters
Haida woodcarvers
Heiltsuk people
Members of the Order of British Columbia
Members of the Order of Canada
Northwest Coast art
Tsimshian woodcarvers